Hamilton Knox Grogan Morgan (1807 – 9 June 1854), known as Hamilton Knox Grogan until 1828, was an Irish Whig, Repeal Association and Conservative politician.

He married Sophia Maria Rowe, daughter of Ebenezer Radford Rowe, with whom he had one child: Jane Colclough Morgan (died 1872).

He held the seat until 1852 when he sought election as a Whig but was defeated.

He was a member of the Reform Club.

References

External links
 

UK MPs 1847–1852
Members of the Parliament of the United Kingdom for County Wexford constituencies (1801–1922)
Irish Repeal Association MPs
1807 births
1854 deaths